The Tanzania Standard Gauge Railway is a railway system, under construction, linking the country to the neighbouring countries of Rwanda and Uganda, and through these two, to Burundi and the Democratic Republic of the Congo, as part of East African Railway Master Plan. The new Standard Gauge Railway (SGR), is intended to replace the old, inefficient metre-gauge railway system.

Overview
This 1435 mm (4 ft  in) railway line is intended to ease the transfer of goods between the port of Dar es Salaam and the cities of Kigali, in Rwanda and subsequently to Bujumbura, in Burundi, and to Goma, in the Democratic Republic of the Congo. From the lake port of Mwanza, surface water ferries are expected to transport goods between Mwanza and Port Bell and Bukasa Inland Port, in Kampala, Uganda's capital city. The SGR system in Tanzania, in conformity with neighboring Rwanda and Uganda is designed to use electricity to power its locomotives.

Phases
The railway system would consist of several major phases:

Phase 1
 Dar es Salaam–Morogoro Section
The first phase has been completed in April 2022 currently in live testing phase.

Construction began in April 2017 and Yapi Merkezi have been showing the progress of construction with monthly video reports on YouTube. Partial funding for this section, amounting to US$1.2 billion, was borrowed from the Export Credit Bank of Turkey. There are six stations: Dar es Salaam, Pugu, Soga, Ruvu, Ngerengere and Morogoro. Three trains will make daily round trips.

With infrastructure complete electrical test, and live train trials began in late April, 2022.

Phase 2
 Morogoro–Makutopora Section
In September 2018, the government of Tanzania secured a soft loan from Standard Chartered Bank, amounting to US$1.46 billion, for the funding of this section of the country's SGR. This section was also contracted to the consortium that is constructing the Dar es Salaam–Morogoro Section. The stations after Morogoro will be Mkata, Kilosa, Kidete, Gulwe, Igunda, Dodoma, Bahi and Makutopora.

As the end of July 2022, the work was reported as having reached 90 percent, and would be completed by Dec 2022..In February 2023 the monthly filming by the main contractor showed work unfinished but good progress made from the previous month.

Phase 3 (aka phase 3, lot 1)
 Makutupora–Tabora Section
The third phase will cover from Makutupora to Tabora which includes 7 stations and 294 kilometers of mainline and 74 kilometers of intersections for a total of 368 kilometers at a cost of $1.9 billion (TZS 4.41 trillion). The contract has been awarded to Yapi Markezi who has constructed the first two phases. The foundation stone was placed in April, 2022 with work to start immediately.

Phase 4 (aka phase 3, lot 2)
 Tabora–Isaka Section 

The fourth phase will cover Tabora to Isaka, . As of August 2022, the Tabora–Isaka section it has been awarded to Yapi Markez and work is in the mobilization stage.

Phase 5
 Isaka–Mwanza Section
In January 2021, The Citizen newspaper reported that two Chinese companies had been selected to construct this section of the SGR. China Civil Engineering Construction (CCEC) and China Railway Construction Company (CRCC), were selected to carry out the work at a contract price of approximately TZS:3 trillion (approx. US$1.3 billion).
Later that month, The EastAfrican reported that Tanzania had secured funding worth $1.32 billion, through the Government of China, for the purpose of building this section of the SGR.
This section is under construction.

Phase 6 
Tabora-Kigoma

The contract was signed on December 20, 2022 between the Government of Tanzania and China Civil Engineering Construction Corporation (CCECC) and China Railway Construction Company (CRCC) for the construction of the railway.

Further planned phases
 Isaka–Rusumo Section
Construction of this section is budgeted at US$942 million. In April 2018, the EastAfrican newspaper reported that the World Bank had expressed its willingness to fund the Isaka-Kigali Standard Gauge Railway.

Funding
Up until February 2020, the government of Tanzania was using locally generated funds and short-term temporary loans to fund the construction of the first two phases of this standard gauge railway project.

In February 2020, the government received a syndicated loan worth US$1.46 billion, towards the completion of the first two phases of the national SGR. The financing package has Standard Chartered as lead arranger and the Export Credit Agencies of Denmark and Sweden, as major funding sources. The combined contract value for the first two phases is US$2.35 billion with US$950 million worth of funding to be organized by the Tanzania Ministry of Finance and the remaining US$1.45 billion by Yapı Merkezi.

Locos

The first operating locos on the SGR are second-hand Austrian Federal Railways class 1014 model electric locomotives. These are primarily used for testing. In addition, TRC has contracted with Hyundai Rotem for the supply of multiple units and electric locomotives.

See also
 Standard-gauge railway
 Isaka–Kigali Standard Gauge Railway
East African Railway Master Plan

References

External links
East African leaders push for quick deal on SGR As of 26 June 2018.

Standard gauge railways in Tanzania
International railway lines
Railway lines in Tanzania
Government-owned companies of Tanzania
Transport in Tanzania
Railway lines opened in 2022